Prenzlau is a rural locality in the Somerset Region, Queensland, Australia.

Geography
Prenzlau is situated in the Lockyer Valley at the southern end of the Somerset Region LGA in southeastern Queensland, Australia.

History 
The area was settled in the 1860s by German immigrants, including the Ruthenberg and Ruhl families, from the Uckermark near Prenzlau in Brandenburg, Germany. The locality name is presumed to have been taken from the German town.

Prenzlau Provisional School opened on 21 October 1894. On 1 May 1900 it became Prenzlau State School.

There was a post office in the town from 1894 to 1968.

Heritage listings 

Heritage-listed sites in Prenzlau include:
 357 Prenzlau Road: Prenzlau State School

Education 
Prenzlau State School is a government primary (Prep-6) school for boys and girls at 357 Prenzlau Road. In 2017, the school had an enrolment of 56 students with 4 teachers and 5 non-teaching staff (3 full-time equivalent).

References

External links

 
 Prenzlau State School

Suburbs of Somerset Region
Localities in Queensland